Duško Vujošević (born 3 March 1959) is a Montenegrin and Serbian professional basketball coach.

Early life
Duško Vujošević was born in Titograd (modern-day Podgorica), PR Montenegro, FPR Yugoslavia. His parents are from Kuči (a region in Podgorica and historical tribe). Vujošević was only five years old when the family moved to Belgrade.

Club coaching

Early career 
Vujošević began his coaching career as a 17-year-old, in 1976. Until 1982 he coached various junior teams in Partizan's youth system. After that, he moved to OKK Beograd for one season and led the club's junior team to the Yugoslav title. The same year, he worked on the coaching staff of OKK Beograd's full squad. After completing the compulsory military service, Vujošević worked at Mladost Zemun for a season.

Partizan

Assistant to Vladislav Lučić
During summer 1985, Vujošević returned to Partizan organization, becoming assistant to the newly arrived head coach Vladislav Lučić. At the pre-season training camp on Mount Zlatibor, Vujošević contracted hepatitis that kept him away from the first team. Even after recovering, he spent most of the season dealing with the club's junior and cadet squads.

Partizan finished out the league season in 5th spot with a 12–10 overall record, which wasn't enough to make the league playoffs, but qualified the club to play in the following season's FIBA Korać Cup.

1986–87: Taking over as head coach mid-season and winning the league
Over the summer 1986, Partizan management led by the club vice-president Dragan Kićanović initiated a major rebuilding effort with the arrival of 20-year-old small forward Žarko Paspalj from KK Budućnost and 18-year-old center Vlade Divac from Sloga Kraljevo who had already been playing for the national team. The head coach position was also looked at with several experienced names such as Vlade Đurović (fresh off winning the league with KK Zadar) being considered. However, in-demand Ðurović went to cross-town rivals Crvena zvezda, while Partizan decided to stay with its head coach Lale Lučić with Vujošević continuing as his assistant.

Lučić got fired in December 1986 and his assistant Vujošević took over as head coach on an interim basis.

Taking over the squad where some of the players were older than him, young Vujošević set about stamping his authority on the team. Guided by the 27-year-old Vujošević, the squad gelled well with talented youngsters being mentored by the more experienced roster players — Paspalj by Goran Grbović, Divac by Milenko Savović, and Đorđević by Željko Obradović. Partizan finished the regular league season in 2nd spot with an 18–4 record, behind defending European champion KK Cibona that amazingly went 22-0 without a single loss. In the playoffs, Partizan faced off against Boža Maljković-coached young KK Split (Jugoplastika) team at the semifinal stage, winning the best-of-three series 2–1. In the final, Partizan somewhat improbably met cross-town rivals Crvena zvezda after they managed to pull out an upset victory over powerhouse Cibona in the other semifinal series. Vujošević's team went ahead in the series, winning the opening game on its home court at Hala sportova. In game 2 on Red Star's home court at Hala Pionir, Partizan beat Vlade Ðurović's team again in a tense contest with many lead changes that was decided by Goran Grbović's three-pointer 23 seconds before the end that put crno-beli two points ahead and later Zoran Radović's failure to convert both free-throws. The game ended 88–89 and Partizan won the series 2-0 as well as the Yugoslav League title, its 4th overall and first for young head coach Vujošević who was only 28 years of age.

1987–88: European Champions Cup Final Four run and losing the Yugoslav League playoff final
Winning the Yugoslav league title made Vujošević's interim head coaching position into a permanent one. In the 1987–88 season, Vujošević took Partizan to the European Champions Cup Final Four in Ghent and finished third. In the following season, Vujošević led Partizan to the Korać Cup title and the Yugoslav Cup trophy.

Vujošević is a coach renowned for his work with young players. He was credited with producing a formidable generation of players who became famous worldwide after making their debut in Partizan (Divac, Paspalj, Predrag Danilović, Aleksandar Đorđević and others).

First time abroad: CD Oximesa
In the 1989–90 season, he was the head coach of the Spanish team CD Oximesa from Granada. Taking over Oximesa for Vujošević meant a reunion with power forward Goran Grbović who had previously been coached by Vujošević in Partizan for two seasons from 1986 until 1988. Furthermore, Vujošević brought along centre Milenko Savović from Partizan with him.

The season was not a successful one after the club failed to make it to the champions group, and later on in the campaign even had to fight hard to avoid relegation.

Back in Partizan for a season
After his poor season in Spain, Vujošević returned to Partizan during summer 1990 after only a year out of the club, succeeding Borislav Ćorković as head coach. Boosted by the return of Paspalj following his unsuccessful NBA stint, Vujošević's team was looking to challenge for major trophies. However, it yet again finished second-best to KK Split despite the reigning European champion losing one of its main players Dino Rađa over the summer as well as being forced to hire new coach Željko Pavličević after Božidar Maljković got lured away by Barcelona. After going 18–4 in the regular season (enough for 2nd place behind 19-3 Split), Partizan managed to defeat Cibona in the playoff semifinal series, but came up short again in the playoff finals versus Split that won the series 2–1.

Red Star Belgrade
In the summer 1991, 32-year-old Vujošević took the head coaching offer from the cross-town rivals KK Crvena zvezda. He led his new team in the 1991–92 season to the playoffs finals where he met his old team KK Partizan led by debutante head coach and Vujošević's former player Željko Obradović. Having won the Euroleage title two months earlier, Partizan ended up winning the league championship contest as well.

Basket Brescia
From 1992 to 1998 Vujošević worked in Italy, coaching Brescia, Pistoia and Scavolini.

Vujošević stayed on, coaching the club in the fourth-tier Italian league during the 1993-94 season and winning promotion back to the third-tier.

After one more , the coach moved on.

Olimpia Pistoia
In the playoffs, Pistoia defeated 8th-placed Viola Reggio Calabria 2-games-to-0 before getting eliminated by the defending champions Virtus Bologna in the next round.

The following season, the team finished the regular season in 10th spot, again making the playoffs. This time they were eliminated at the very first hurdle against Pallacanestro Varese.

Victoria Libertas Pesaro
In summer 1997, Vujosevic made a move to another bottom-dwelling Serie A club, joining Victoria Libertas, the once storied club that had fallen on hard times financially in the meantime.

After returning from Italy, Vujošević joined the coaching staff of Budućnost as a consultant to head coach Muta Nikolić for the 1998–99 season. The following two seasons, from 1999 to 2001 he was the head coach of Radnički Beograd.

Partizan, CSKA and Partizan again
Since his return to Partizan in 2001, he has won nine consecutive national championships (2002–2010), four cups (2002, 2008, 2009, 2010), and four consecutive Adriatic League titles (2007-2010), thus becoming the most successful coach in the club's history. Also, under his management Partizan made it to the Euroleague Final Four, in the 2009–10 Euroleague season.

He won the Alexander Gomelsky Coach of the Year award as the best Euroleague coach of the 2008–09 season. On 25 June 2010, Vujošević signed three-year contract with Russian club CSKA Moscow. Only few months later, Vujošević and CSKA Moscow decided to part their ways after elimination in the first stage of Euroleague.

On 25 June 2012, after two years of not working as head coach, Vujošević signed a long-term contract with Partizan Belgrade.

On 8 September 2015, he parted ways with Partizan. The coach's departure from the state-funded KK Partizan occurred amid controversy and acrimony over his criticism directed at the ruling party in Serbia, especially Prime Minister Aleksandar Vučić. In subsequent interviews Vujošević has made claims that Vučić's government effectively forced his removal by presenting the club management with a situation of cutting its funding if he remains its coach.

Limoges CSP
On 13 January 2016, Vujošević took over French club Limoges CSP. While coaching Limoges, they finished 10th in the LNB Pro A, and he led his team to the round of 16 in the French Basketball Cup.

He left the team at the end of the 2016–2017. season.

U BT Cluj-Napoca 
On 18 June 2019, Duško signed a one-year deal with Romanian basketball club U-BT Cluj-Napoca. In the 2019–2020 season his club finished 2nd in the Liga Națională group A, Romaina's first division, before the season got cancelled due to the COVID-19 pandemic.

On June 24, 2020, he signed a one-year extension with the club, that season he won the Liga Națională, and the Romanian Basketball Cup. At the end of the season he left the club.

National team coaching career

SFR Yugoslavia youth teams

1988 European Championship for Juniors
As head coach of the Yugoslavia junior national team (players born in 1970), Vujošević won the 1988 European Championship for Juniors held on home soil in Titov Vrbas and Srbobran. Playing at home with a talented squad led by Predrag Danilović, Arijan Komazec, Žan Tabak, Rastko Cvetković, Oliver Popović, and Dževad Alihodžić, Yugoslavia won all of its games en route to the trophy.

1991 FIBA Under-19 World Championship
In summer 1991, Vujošević selected the Yugoslav U19 team for the World Under-19 Championship in Edmonton, Canada. With Veljko Mršić, Dejan Bodiroga, Dragan Tarlać, Borko Radović, Željko Rebrača, Teo Čizmić, and Željko Topalović on its roster, the team made it out of the initial group stage with a 2–1 record (winning over Soviet Union and Syria, but losing to Brazil).

At the next group stage Vujošević's Yugoslavia faced Italy (loss), Romania (win), and Spain (loss), finishing tied for the second spot with Spain with a 1–2 record, however, Yugoslavs advanced because of better basket difference thus qualifying for the semifinals.

In the semifinals, Yugoslavia faced the United States led by Lance Miller, Bryan Caver, Wesley Person, Khalid Reeves, Ed Stokes, and Antonio Lang, losing a close game 74–76.

In the 3rd place match versus Argentina featuring Jorge Racca, Gabriel Cocha Silva, Gabriel Diaz, Alejandro Montecchia, Carlos Simoni, Claudio Farabello, and Rubén Wolkowyski, Vujošević's team lost another close contest 71-74 thus finishing just out of the medals with an overall 3–5 record.

Serbia-Montenegro
On 22 March 2003, Vujošević's appointment as head coach of the reigning European and World champions Serbia and Montenegro national basketball team was announced, with the upcoming EuroBasket 2003 in Sweden being his first order of business. Taking over for Svetislav Pešić and signing on for two years plus an optional third year with the Basketball Federation of Serbia and Montenegro (KSSCG), Vujošević took the national team head coaching job in parallel with his club head coaching duties at KK Partizan.

Due to many of the team's stars—most notably Dejan Bodiroga and Vlade Divac—taking the summer off from the national team, Vujošević turned to a mix of young prospects as well as players who had been on the national team fringes previously. The preparation stage for the competition was further marked by Vujošević's mid-August 2003 decision to kick thirty-one-year-old veteran center Dejan Koturović out of the team's training camp, reportedly due to lack of discipline. The decision turned into an immediate public row between the two. The coach and the player soon made up publicly with Koturović being reinstated in the team and eventually even making the final 12-man roster Vujošević took to the tournament. Six final roster spots were filled with national team debutantes at major competitions—eighteen-year-old Kosta Perović, twenty-one-year-old Vule Avdalović, twenty-four-year-old Ognjen Aškrabić, twenty-seven-year-old Đuro Ostojić, twenty-seven-year-old Dušan Vukčević, and twenty-nine-year-old Nebojša Bogavac.

At the EuroBasket 2003 in Sweden, Serbia-Montenegro experienced hard time getting into the quarterfinals where it lost by 16 points to Lithuania that would go on to win the championship. Finishing the tournament in sixth place was seen as disappointment for Serbia-Montenegro.

Montenegro
In April 2007, Vujošević accepted the head coach position of the Montenegro national basketball team. He stayed at the position until 20 November 2010, reportedly resigning out of desire to focus solely on his head coaching job at CSKA Moscow that he had been performing for several months already. Ironically, CSKA fired Vujošević only five days later.

Bosnia and Herzegovina
In April 2017, he was named as the head coach of the Bosnia and Herzegovina national team. He held this position until August 2018.

Coaching record

Euroleague

|- 
| align="left" |Partizan
| align="left" |1987–88
| 18 || 13 || 5 ||  || align="center"|Won in 3rd place game
|- 
| align="left" rowspan=9|Partizan
| align="left" |2001–02
| 14 || 6 || 8 ||  || align="center"|Eliminated in group play
|- 
| align="left" |2002–03
| 13 || 4 || 9 ||  || align="center"|Eliminated in group play
|- 
| align="left" |2003–04
| 14 || 6 || 8 ||  || align="center"|Eliminated in group play
|- 
| align="left" |2004–05
| 14 || 2 || 12 ||  || align="center"|Eliminated in group play
|- 
| align="left" |2005–06
| 14 || 2 || 12 ||  || align="center"|Eliminated in group play
|- 
| align="left" |2006–07
| 20 || 8 || 12 ||  || align="center"|Eliminated in Top 16 Stage
|- 
| align="left" |2007–08
| 23 || 11 || 12 ||  || align="center"|Lost in Quarterfinal Playoffs
|- 
| align="left" |2008–09
| 19 || 9 || 10 ||  || align="center"|Lost in Quarterfinal Playoffs
|- 
| align="left" |2009–10
| 22 || 11 || 11 ||  || align="center"|Lost in 3rd place game
|- 
| align="left" |CSKA Moscow
| align="left" |2010–11
| 6 || 1 || 5 ||  || align="center"|(fired)
|- 
| align="left" rowspan=2|Partizan
| align="left" |2012–13
| 10 || 2 || 8 ||  || align="center"|Eliminated in group play
|- 
| align="left" |2013–14
| 24 || 7 || 17 ||  || align="center"|Eliminated in Top 16 Stage
|-class="sortbottom"
| align="center" colspan=2|Career||211||82||129||||

Political activity 
On 24 February 2022, it was announced that the opposition coalition around the Social Democratic Party (SDS) named Vujošević as their ballot carrier and mayoral candidate for the upcoming Belgrade City Assembly election. Vujošević's list won 2.92% of the popular vote, failing to gain a seat in the City Assembly.

Personal life
Vujošević suffers from diabetes, which has over the years caused the emergence of gangrene. In September 2017, he had to amputate the fourth toe on his left foot due to gangrene.

In May 2018, he was made an honorary citizen of Sarajevo for his extraordinary contribution to the development of sport and the affirmation of Sarajevo and Bosnia and Herzegovina.

See also 
 List of ABA League-winning coaches
 List of BLS-winning head coaches
 List of Radivoj Korać Cup-winning head coaches

References

External links

 Duško Vujošević at euroleague.net

1959 births
Living people
ABA League-winning coaches
Limoges CSP coaches
BKK Radnički coaches
KK Crvena zvezda head coaches
KK Mladost Zemun coaches
KK Partizan coaches
Kuči
OKK Beograd coaches
Montenegrin basketball coaches
Montenegrin expatriate basketball people in Serbia
PBC CSKA Moscow coaches
Serbian men's basketball coaches
Serbian people of Montenegrin descent
Sportspeople from Belgrade
Sportspeople from Podgorica
Victoria Libertas Pesaro coaches
Yugoslav basketball coaches
Serbia and Montenegro national basketball team coaches
Serbian expatriate basketball people in Italy
Serbian expatriate basketball people in France
Serbian expatriate basketball people in Bosnia and Herzegovina
Serbian expatriate basketball people in Russia
Serbian expatriate basketball people in Spain